Eric Andrew Posner (born December 5, 1965) is an American lawyer and legal scholar who has served as a counsel for the Department of Justice Antitrust Division since 2022. As a law professor at the University of Chicago Law School, Posner has taught international law, contract law, and bankruptcy, among other areas.  As of 2021, he was the second most-cited active legal scholar in the United States. He is the son of retired Seventh Circuit Judge Richard Posner.

Education 
Posner attended Yale University (B.A. and M.A. degrees in philosophy, summa cum laude) and received his J.D. degree, magna cum laude, from Harvard Law School in 1991. He clerked for Judge Stephen F. Williams of the D.C. Circuit.

Career 
Posner started his teaching career at the University of Pennsylvania Law School from 1993 to 1998. In 1998, Posner joined the University of Chicago Law School where he is now the Kirkland and Ellis Distinguished Service Professor of Law and Esther Kane Research Chair. He has also been a visiting professor at Columbia Law School and NYU School of Law. From 1998 to 2011, he was an editor of The Journal of Legal Studies. He is the author or co-author of many books and articles, on subjects including international law, cost-benefit analysis, and constitutional law.  At Chicago he teaches Antitrust, Contracts, Public International Law, and Financial Regulation, amongst other courses. Beginning in 2022, Posner began service as Counsel to the Assistant Attorney General for Antitrust at the United States Department of Justice.

Work 

Posner's published books have ranged over several topics including international law, foreign relations law, contracts, and game theory and the law. In 2005, Posner posted about the trial of the deposed Iraqi President Saddam Hussein.

In June 2013, Posner and Jameel Jaffer, fellow at the Open Society Foundations, participated in The New York Times Room for Debate series. Posner responded to concerns about expanded National Security Agency (NSA) programs that vacuum information about the private lives of American citizens. Those who oppose the surveillance claim that the collection and storing of unlimited metadata is a highly invasive form of surveillance of citizens' communications. Posner claimed that Americans obtain the services they want by disclosing private information to strangers such as doctors and insurance companies. Posner in 2013 argued that since 2001 there had not been a single instance of "war-on-terror-related surveillance in which the government used information obtained for security purposes to target a political opponent, dissenter or critic".

In 2015, Posner co-founded the book review The New Rambler. Posner's position concerning the heightened standing of the executive branch of government was criticized in 2016 by Jeremy Waldron in his book Political Political Theory as not sufficiently sensitive to issue of legislative priorities. In 2018, Posner co-wrote an article advocating a system of market-oriented, privately sponsored work visas as a supplement to U.S. immigration policy.

Selected bibliography

Books 
Law and Social Norms (Harvard University Press, 2000). 
The Limits of International Law (Oxford University Press, 2005) (with Jack Goldsmith). 
Terror in the Balance: Security, Liberty, and the Courts (Oxford University Press, 2007) (with Adrian Vermeule). 
Perils of Global Legalism (University of Chicago Press, 2009) 
Law and Happiness (University of Chicago Press, 2010) 
Climate Change Justice (Princeton University Press, 2010) (with David Weisbach) 
The Executive Unbound: After the Madisonian Republic (with Adrian Vermeule)(Oxford University Press 2011) ,
Contract Law and Theory (Aspen 2011) 
Economic Foundations of International Law (Harvard 2013) (with Alan Sykes) 
The Twilight of Human Rights Law (Oxford University Press 2014) 
Radical Markets (Princeton University Press  2018)  (with E. Glen Weyl)
Last Resort: The Financial Crisis and the Future Bailouts (University of Chicago Press, 2018) 
The Demagogue's Playbook: The Battle for American Democracy from the Founders to Trump (All Points Books, 2020)

Articles 
"Understanding the Resemblance Between Modern and Traditional Customary International Law", 40 Va. J. Int'l Law 639 (2000; with Jack L. Goldsmith)
"Moral and Legal Rhetoric in International Relations: A Rational Choice Perspective", 31 J. Legal Stud. S115 (2002; with Jack Goldsmith)
"Do States Have a Moral Obligation to Comply with International Law?", 55 Stan. L. Rev. 1901 (2003)
"A Theory of the Laws of War", 70 U. Chi. L. Rev. 297 (2003)
"Transnational Legal Process and the Supreme Court's 2003–2004 Term: Some Skeptical Observations", 12 Tulsa Journal of Comparative and International Law 23 (2004)
"Judicial Independence in International Tribunals", 93 Cal. L. Rev. 1 (2005; with John Yoo)
"Optimal War and Jus ad Bellum", 93 Georgetown L.J. 993 (2005) (with Alan Sykes)
"Terrorism and the Laws of War", 5 Chi. J. Int'l L. 423 (2005)
"International Law and the Disaggregated State", 32 Fla. St. U. L. Rev. 797 (2005)
"International Law and the Rise of China", 7 Chi. J. Int'l L. 1 (2006; with John Yoo)
"International Law: A Welfarist Approach", 73 U. Chi. L. Rev. 487 (2006)
"An Economic Analysis of State and Individual Responsibility Under International Law", Amer. L. & Econ. Rev. (forthcoming; with Alan Sykes)
"Deference to the Executive in the United States after September 11: Congress, the Courts, and the Office of Legal Counsel," 35 Harvard Journal of Law and Public Policy 213 (2012).
 "Is the International Court of Justice Biased?," J. Legal Stud. (forthcoming) (with Miguel de Figueiredo).

Newspaper columns 
"Judges v. Trump: Be Careful What You Wish For," The New York Times, February 15, 2017
"A Threat That Belongs Behind Bars," The New York Times, June 25, 2006
"Apply the Golden Rule to al Qaeda?", The Wall Street Journal, July 15, 2006, p. A9
"Bitcoin is a Ponzi scheme—the Internet's favorite currency will collapse", Slate Magazine, April 11, 2013

Personal life 
He has a wife and two children. He is a son of the former United States Court of Appeals for the Seventh Circuit judge Richard Posner.

References

External links 
EricPosner, official website
CV
Facebook page
Blog

University of Chicago Law School biography
Posner participates in a panel, The Middle East: Crisis and Conflict at the Pritzker Military Museum & Library

Video (and audio) of debates and discussions involving Eric Posner on Bloggingheads.tv

20th-century American Jews
1965 births
Living people
University of Chicago Laboratory Schools alumni
Yale University alumni
Harvard Law School alumni
University of Chicago faculty
University of Pennsylvania Law School faculty
International law scholars
American scholars of constitutional law
Scholars of contract law
Immigration law scholars
The New Rambler
21st-century American Jews
United States Department of Justice lawyers